Emma Michelle Kearney (born 24 September 1989) is an Australian rules footballer and former cricketer. She previously played cricket for the Melbourne Stars in the Women's Big Bash League (WBBL) and for Victoria in the Women's National Cricket League (WNCL).

Early life
Kearney was born in the Victorian town of Hamilton, and raised on a sheep station in nearby Cavendish. She played football through her early years, but was forced to give up the sport at the age of twelve when barred from playing with the youth boys team.

She attended high school at Monivae College in Hamilton.

Australian rules football

State league and representative football
Kearney returned to football while studying a physical education teaching degree at university in Ballarat. She began playing state league football in 2010, joining Melbourne University in the Victorian Women's Football League (VWFL). Kearney won her club's best and fairest award five times, and she was a member of the 2016 grand final team that ultimately lost to the Darebin Falcons.

In 2013, Kearney was a member of the triumphant Victorian team at the AFL Women's National Championship in Cairns.

AFL Women's career

Western Bulldogs 
Kearney was signed by the Western Bulldogs as a priority player in August 2016 as part of the inaugural AFL Women's draft. Per the newly formed league's rules, her off-field work at the club made her eligible for the special pre-draft signing. She faced a limited pre-season, missing eight training sessions due to cricketing commitments across the 2016–17 summer.

Making her AFLW debut in the club's inaugural match, in round one of the 2017 season against  at VU Whitten Oval, Kearney recorded a game-high 23 disposals on the night. In round six against  at South Pine Sports Complex, she gathered 30 disposals during the match, becoming the competition's first player to achieve the feat. At the end of the 2017 season, Kearney was listed in the All-Australian team and finished equal-first in her club's best and fairest count alongside Ellie Blackburn.

Having re-signed with the Western Bulldogs during the trade period in May 2017, Kearney enjoyed a standout individual 2018 season, winning the league's best and fairest and the AFL Coaches Champion Player of the Year (tied with Chelsea Randall from ) awards. She also shared in ultimate team success as the Bulldogs defeated Brisbane in the 2018 AFL Women's Grand Final. With five minutes left in the match, Kearney ran down Kaitlyn Ashmore to win a crucial holding-the-ball free kick. She subsequently converted a set shot 30 metres out from goal to give her team a twelve-point lead and help clinch the premiership.

North Melbourne 
In April 2018, Kearney accepted an offer to play with expansion club  for the 2019 season. In November 2018, she was announced as the inaugural captain of the team. In each of the following three seasons, Kearney finished runner-up in the club's best and fairest award. She also polled well in the 2020 league best and fairest count, receiving eleven votes to place third.

Kearney earned her fifth consecutive All-Australian selection in 2021, making her one of only two players to manage the accomplishment (the other being Karen Paxman from ). In June 2021, North Melbourne confirmed she was contracted with the club for the following season.

Kearney was forced to miss the first round of the 2022 AFLW season after contracting COVID-19. She returned shortly thereafter and became a consistent player across both the backline and in the midfield. She was named captain of the 2022 AFL Women's All-Australian team, and her presence in the team made her the only player in the history of the competition to feature in all six of the league's first six representative teams.

Cricket

Kearney played grade cricket for Essendon Maribyrnong Park Ladies Cricket Club in Melbourne's inner-north. She was selected for the Victorian Spirit during the 2013–14 season for the first time, and played 20 WNCL matches with the team through to the end of the 2016–17 season.

Having been signed by the Melbourne Stars ahead of the inaugural WBBL season, Kearney took seven wickets from twelve matches in 2015–16, then claimed eight wickets from fourteen matches at an economy rate of 5.27 in 2016–17.

Dual sports controversy
Kearney garnered media attention in December 2016 on account of her dual-sports status. She revealed that she had been asked by Cricket Australia to sign documents committing her to prioritise cricket training and matches over AFL Women's training sessions held during the cricket season. At the time, Kearney voiced public criticism of the decision by cricket bosses in light of the semi-professional nature of the league.

Personal life
Outside of cricket and football, Kearney has worked as a physical education teacher, including at Mount Alexander College in Flemington. She holds a bachelor of physical education from Ballarat University. As part of her move to play football for North Melbourne, Kearney accepted employment as sport and recreation coordinator at the club's community organization, The Huddle.

AFL Women's statistics
Statistics are correct to the end of the 2021 season.

|- style=background:#EAEAEA
| scope=row | 2017 ||  || 5
| 7 || 0 || 4 || 82 || 68 || 150 || 17 || 20 || 0.0 || 0.6 || 11.7 || 9.7 || 21.4 || 2.4 || 2.9 || 7
|-
| scope=row bgcolor=F0E68C | 2018# ||  || 5
| 8 || 3 || 5 || bgcolor=CAE1FF | 123† || 29 || bgcolor=CAE1FF | 152† || 27 || 41 || 0.4 || 0.6 || bgcolor=CAE1FF | 15.4† || 3.6 || bgcolor=CAE1FF | 19.0† || 3.4 || 5.1 || bgcolor=98FB98 | 14±
|- style=background:#EAEAEA
| scope=row | 2019 ||  || 9
| 7 || 1 || 2 || 96 || 45 || 141 || 22 || 36 || 0.1 || 0.3 || 13.7 || 6.4 || 20.1 || 3.1 || 5.1 || 3
|-
| scope=row | 2020 ||  || 9
| 7 || 3 || 1 || 91 || 53 || 144 || 24 || 31 || 0.4 || 0.1 || 13.0 || 7.6 || 20.6 || 3.4 || 4.4 || 11
|- style=background:#EAEAEA
| scope=row | 2021 ||  || 9
| 10 || 4 || 3 || 118 || 90 || 208 || 28 || 46 || 0.4 || 0.3 || 11.8 || 9.0 || 20.8 || 2.8 || 4.6 || 4
|- class=sortbottom
! colspan=3 | Career
! 39 !! 11 !! 15 !! 510 !! 285 !! 795 !! 118 !! 174 !! 0.3 !! 0.4 !! 13.1 !! 7.3 !! 20.4 !! 3.0 !! 4.5 !! 39
|}

References

External links

 
 

1989 births
Living people
Western Bulldogs (AFLW) players
Australian women cricketers
Australian rules footballers from Victoria (Australia)
Cricketers from Victoria (Australia)
Victoria women cricketers
Melbourne Stars (WBBL) cricketers
All-Australians (AFL Women's)
North Melbourne Football Club (AFLW) players
Lesbian sportswomen
Australian LGBT sportspeople
LGBT cricketers
LGBT players of Australian rules football
Melbourne University Football Club (VFLW) players
Federation University Australia alumni
People from Hamilton, Victoria
Sportswomen from Victoria (Australia)